The Air Education Training Command Collaboration Portal(ACP) provides collaboration services to the United States Air Force academic institutions and select training organizations. The Air Collaboration Portal has evolved and now provides other collaboration components such as blogs, wikis, and instant messaging to the U.S. Air Force.

History and mission 
AETC Collaboration Portal was established in 2007 as a single enterprise environment that enhances cyber security to the Air Force ".mil" network. The Air Collaboration Portal creates a collaboration environment to enhance training, education, and research for the United States Air Force. The mission statement is "Establish and maintain one “af.edu” domain, without exposing the af.mil network to security risks." The Air Collaboration Portal benefits Air Force users worldwide.

The Air Collaboration Portal provides the following benefits: 
Reduces security risks caused by non-compliant computers on the .mil network
Gives faculty and staff a less restrictive environment to meet mission requirements
Enhances software approval process
Provides network services to foreign researchers
Federates with commercial instant messaging (Google, MSN, AOL) and e-mail
Provides mission acceptable access through the proxy.

Users 
AETC Collaboration Portal's stated goal is to enable Air Force personnel, both airmen and civilian contractors access to information anywhere, anytime.
Authorized users include the following:
 Active Air Force
 DoD Civilian
 Air Force Reserves
 Future airmen
 Air National Guard
 ROTC cadets
 National Guard
 U.S. Military Academy cadets
 Foreign officers (attached to U.S. Air Force)
 Contractors

Capabilities and features 
AETC Collaboration Portal offers multiple enterprise collaboration features and capabilities to the Air Force.

Features and capabilities include:
Web-based e-mail
Instant messaging
Federated enterprise search
Blogs 
Wikis 
Forums 
Web-based document repositories 
Single sign on (SSO)
Team collaboration websites
Directory and item level security

Accomplishments and supported units 
AETC Collaboration Portal is innovative in scope and concept for collaboration, research, and training. They can be credited with providing highly mobile Civilian Institute students and faculty with e-mail addresses, web portals, and instant messaging capabilities. It also enhances professional development, and cultural awareness.

The Air Collaboration Portal supports the following organizations:
Air Education Training Command
Keesler Online
Air University
Air Force Culture and Language Center
Air Force Academy
Air Force Institute of Technology
Airman Advancement Division
Air Force Special Operations Command

Enterprise Service Desk 
Assistance provided via: 
E-mail
Telephone
Knowledge base 
Chat
Web

References

External links
Air Force Portal
Air Education Training Command (AETC) Portal
Air Force Institute of Technology (AFIT) Home Page
Air Force Academy (USAFA) Home Page
Air Force Air University (AU) Home Page
AETC Collaboration Portal (ACP) Home Page

United States Air Force